Huangsha Station is a station on Line 1 of the Guangzhou Metro and was the first Line 1 station to have platform screen doors installed. It started operations on 28June 1997. It was the terminus of Line 1 when the Guangzhou Metro started the service in 1997. It is situated under the junction of Datong Road and Liu'ersan Road in the Liwan District of Guangzhou. It is near Shamian Island, where the  White Swan Hotel and many Western style buildings are. It became an interchange station between Line 1 and Line 6 of the Guangzhou Metro in 2013.

Station layout

References

Railway stations in China opened in 1997
Guangzhou Metro stations in Liwan District